Giulia Steingruber (born 24 March 1994) is a retired Swiss artistic gymnast. She is the 2016 Olympic and 2017 World bronze medalist on vault.  Additionally she is the 2015 European all-around champion, a four-time European vault champion (2013, 2014, 2016, and 2021) and the 2016 European floor exercise champion.

Steingruber also competed for Switzerland at the 2012, 2016 and 2020 Olympic Games. She is the first Swiss female gymnast to win the European all-around title and the first Swiss female gymnast ever to win an Olympic gymnastics medal of any color.

Senior career

2011
At the 2011 World Artistic Gymnastics Championships, Steingruber finished 16th in the all-around and 5th on vault.

2012
Steingruber won the bronze medal on vault in the 2012 European Women's Artistic Gymnastics Championships.

Competing at the 2012 Summer Olympics as the only women's gymnast from Switzerland, Steingruber finished 14th in the women's individual all-around with a score of 56.148. She was a reserve for the vault final.

In December 2012, she competed at the World Cup event in Stuttgart, Germany and won bronze with a total score of 55.565, which included an impressive vault score of 15.400.

2013
Steingruber competed at the City of Jesolo Trophy in March and placed 8th in the individual all-around, with a total score of 55.550. Later that month, she competed at the La Roche-sur-Yon World Cup event in France and placed first on the vault and uneven bars with scores of 13.433 and 13.600 respectively. She went on to win bronze in the vault final at the Doha World Cup, scoring a 15.225 on her first vault and a 14.100 on her second, for an average of 14.662.

At the 2013 European Artistic Gymnastics Championships in Moscow, she qualified first into the vault final and went on to take gold with an average of 14.750. She also qualified for the individual all-around and floor finals. In the all-around final, she tied for fourth with Romanian gymnast Diana Bulimar with a score of 57.065, while on floor she finished 6th with a score of 14.100.

At the 2013 World Artistic Gymnastics Championships, Steingruber finished seventh in the all-around, fourth on vault, and fifth on floor exercise.

2014
At the 2014 European Championships, Steingruber won a gold medal on vault with a score of 14.666.

At the 2014 World Artistic Gymnastics Championships, Steingruber qualified to the all-around final and placed 15th with a score of 55.132. She also tied for 5th place in the vault final with Great Britain's Claudia Fragapane, with a score of 14.716.

2015
At the 2015 European Artistic Gymnastics Championships, Steingruber won the all-around title ahead of Maria Kharenkova of Russia and Ellie Downie of Great Britain, with a score of 57.873, becoming the first Swiss gymnast to ever win the European All-Around title. However, she failed to defend her vault title, and was beaten by the 2012 Olympic vault bronze medalist Maria Paseka; Steingruber won the silver medal with a score of 15.149. She also qualified to the uneven bars final and placed 6th with a score of 13.766. Steingruber qualified first to the floor final and ended up winning the bronze medal with a score of 14.466 behind silver medalist Claudia Fragapane of Great Britain and gold medalist Ksenia Afanasyeva of Russia. Steingruber's three medals made her the most decorated gymnast from these championships.

In June she competed at the 2015 European Games held in Baku, along with teammates Jessica Diacci and Caterina Barloggio. She won the silver medal in the all-around, with a score of 56.699. In addition, she won the gold medal on vault, with a total score of 14.999  and on floor, with a score of 14.266. She was also the bronze medalist on the balance beam, with a 13.700.

Later, she competed in the 2015 Glasgow World Championships. She qualified to the all around final (she finished 5th with a score of 57.333), floor, and vault finals. She injured her knee in the vault final (7th tied with Alexa Moreno with a score of 14.533) and withdrew from the floor final.

2016
At the 2016 European Championships, Steingruber helped the Swiss team qualify to the team final in third place behind only Great Britain and Russia. She also qualified first to the vault final with an average score of 15.433, eighth to the bars final with a score of 14.033, and second to the floor final with a score of 14.966. In the team final, she contributed an all-around score of 57.657 to help lead the Swiss team to a fourth place finish. In event finals, Steingruber won her third European vault title with an average score of 14.983, just 0.05 ahead of Ellie Downie, becoming the first gymnast in history to win three European championship titles on vault. She then placed sixth in the uneven bars final with a score of 14.166, and won the floor final for her first European title on the event with a massive score of 15.200, finishing 0.634 ahead of Downie, the silver medalist.

At the 2016 Summer Olympics, where she was the sole female gymnast for Switzerland, Steingruber was chosen to be the flag bearer at the opening ceremony, becoming the second gymnast to ever receive this honor since Daniel Giubellini in 1992, and the first female gymnast to do so. She delivered an excellent performance in the qualification round (minus a fall on the balance beam) and qualified in 14th place to the all-around final with a score of 56.899. She also qualified 3rd to the vault final with an average of 15.266, and 4th to the floor final with a score of 14.666.
 
In the individual all-around final, Steingruber finished in a respectable 10th place with a score of 57.565, the highest finish by a Swiss gymnast in a non-boycotted Olympic games. Her scores on both vault (15.366) and floor (14.733) were among the top four of all the gymnasts that competed in the all-around. In the vault final, she performed a clean layout Rudi (scoring 15.533) and a double twisting Yurchenko (scoring 14.900) to win the bronze medal with an average of 15.216, 0.037 behind silver medalist Maria Paseka of Russia (15.253). American Simone Biles won the vault title with an average of 15.966. Steingruber's bronze is the first ever Olympic medal of any color for Switzerland in women's gymnastics, and the first Olympic medal for a gymnast native to Switzerland since 1952 (a Chinese-born Li Donghua won a gold medal for Switzerland on the pommel horse in 1996). Steingruber went on to finish 8th in the floor exercise with a score of 11.800 after falling on her double-double mount and springing out of bounds and later falling on her tucked full-in dismount. Despite her finish, she is the first female Swiss gymnast to make the floor exercise final.

2017

In late 2017 Steingruber attended the World Championships in Montreal.  She competed in the all-around final where she finished in seventh place, with a total score of 53.666. Her score of 14.700 on vault was the highest on the apparatus during the final.  During event finals Steingruber won the bronze on vault, scoring an average of 14.466, finishing behind defending world vault champion Maria Paseka of Russia (14.850) and Jade Carey of the USA (14.766). It was her first World Championship Medal.

2018
Steingruber showcased her full difficulty sets in June at the Koper World Cup in Slovenia, winning gold medals on vault and floor, and a silver medal on balance beam. At a competition in France in early July, she injured herself during a routine on floor exercise and fractured her Tibia, as well as tearing her ACL and meniscus, ending her bid for the European Championships in Glasgow, Scotland and the World Championships in Doha, Qatar.

2019
Steingruber made her comeback at the 2019 Swiss Championships in September, over a year after sustaining her injury, where she won the all-around with a score of 53.100.  Afterwards she was named to the team to compete at the World Championships in Stuttgart, Germany alongside Ilaria Käslin, Stenfanie Siegenthaler, Anny Wu, and Caterina Barloggio.  The following week she competed at the Second Heerenveen Friendly where she helped the Switzerland finish in third behind the Netherlands and Spain.  Individually she placed second in the all-around behind Naomi Visser of the Netherlands.

At the World Championships Steingruber qualified to the all-around final and as a result qualified as an individual to the 2020 Olympic Games in Tokyo.  She was also the first reserve for the vault final and third reserve for the floor exercise final.  During the all-around final she finished in 18th place.

2020–21

As a result of a Covid-19 pandemic Steingruber did not participate in any competitions during 2020 as most competitions were canceled or postponed.

Steingruber competed at the 2021 European Championships held in Basel.  She won gold on vault ahead of Jessica Gadirova and Angelina Melnikova.  At the Olympic Games she was the first reserve for the vault final and finished 15th in the all-around final.

On October 1, 2021 Giulia Steingruber announced her retirement.

Eponymous skill
Steingruber has one eponymous skill listed in the Code of Points.

Competitive history

References

External links

 
 

1994 births
Living people
Swiss female artistic gymnasts
Gymnasts at the 2012 Summer Olympics
Gymnasts at the 2016 Summer Olympics
Olympic gymnasts of Switzerland
Gymnasts at the 2015 European Games
European Games medalists in gymnastics
European Games gold medalists for Switzerland
European Games silver medalists for Switzerland
European Games bronze medalists for Switzerland
Medalists at the 2016 Summer Olympics
Medalists at the World Artistic Gymnastics Championships
Olympic bronze medalists for Switzerland
Olympic medalists in gymnastics
European champions in gymnastics
Originators of elements in artistic gymnastics
Gymnasts at the 2020 Summer Olympics
Sportspeople from St. Gallen (city)
21st-century Swiss women